Janša is a Slovene surname. Notable people with the surname include:

 Anton Janša (1734–1773), Slovenian apiculturist and painter
 Janez Janša (born in 1958 as Ivan Janša), Slovenian politician and incumbent Prime Minister of Slovenia
 Janez Janša (born in 1964 as Emil Hrvatin), Slovenian author, director and performer
 Janez Janša (born in 1973 as Žiga Kariž), Slovenian visual artist
 Janez Janša (born in 1970 as Davide Grassi), Slovenian performance artist
 Leopold Jansa, Bohemian composer
 Tone Janša (born in 1943), Slovenian jazz musician

Slovene-language surnames